Murer is the surname of:

 Eugène Murer (1841–1906), French pastry chef, author, self-taught painter and collector of impressionist paintings, born Hyacinthe-Eugène Meunier
 Fabiana Murer (born 1981), Brazilian retired pole vaulter
 Franz Murer (1912–1994), Austrian World War II SS non-commissioned officer in charge of the Vilno Ghetto
 Fredi M. Murer (born 1940), Swiss filmmaker
 Henny Mürer (1925–1997), Norwegian choreographer and dancer
 Jos Murer (1530–1580), Zürich poet, topographer, stained glass maker and mathematician

See also
 Maurer, another surname
 Dani Morer (born 1998), Spanish footballer
 Pau Morer (born 1995), Spanish footballer